The Familia ("The Family", from Latin familia) was the name of an 18th-century Polish political faction led by the House of Czartoryski and allied families. It was formed towards the end of the reign of King of Poland Augustus II the Strong (reign. 1697–1706, 1709–1733). The Familia's principal leaders were Michał Fryderyk Czartoryski, Grand Chancellor of Lithuania, his brother August Aleksander Czartoryski, Voivode of Ruthenia (Rus), their sister Konstancja Czartoryska, and their brother-in-law (from 1720), Stanisław Poniatowski, Castellan of Kraków.

Formation

During the interregnum in 1733, the Familia supported Stanisław I Leszczyński for King. Polish Kings in the period were elected by ballot, by the nobility (Elective Monarchy). The Familia decided to support the Saxon Frederick Augustus II as candidate (elected King Augustus III - reign. 1734–1763 in Poland), instead, and thus became a party of the Royal Court. Following the failure of the Polish Sejm to pass reforms (between 1744 and 1750) the Familia distanced itself from the struggling Royal Court. In foreign affairs, they now represented a pro-Russian orientation (see "War of Polish Succession").

During the next Polish interregnum (1763–1764) near the end of the "Seven Years' War" in Europe, an armed Russian intervention in Poland gave the Familia the opportunity to vanquish their opponents at home. When in 1764 Adam Kazimierz Czartoryski declined to seek election to the throne, the Czartoryskis agreed to the election, instead, of their kinsman Stanisław August Poniatowski, a one-time lover of the Russian Empress Catherine II "the Great".

Around the same time, the Familia succeeded in partially enacting their previous program of reforms. Among others, this included the creation of a Royal Treasury and military commissions who limited the  power of Treasurers and Hetmans. The disruptive liberum veto was suspended. Further reforms were, however, blocked by Russian and Prussian interference. The conservative opponents of the Familia and the King, backed by Russia's Catherine II, formed, in 1767, the Radom Confederation. At the infamous Repnin Sejm, they were obliged to repeal part of the recently introduced reforms for fear of further unwanted intervention.

Familia in the period of Partitions

After the First Partition of Poland (February 17, 1772), the Familia became the core of magnate opposition to the King and the Permanent Council, while seeking support in Austria (only to shift in 1788 to a pro-Prussian stance). At the Four-Year Sejm (1788–1792), it was only in 1790 that Familia's representatives, which included Ignacy Potocki, effected a rapprochement with the King and his party. Together with him and the Patriotic Party the Familia now worked towards the enactment of Poland's revolutionary May 3rd Constitution in 1791.

See also
Szlachta
List of szlachta
Magnates of Poland and Lithuania
Princely houses of Poland and Lithuania

References

Defunct political parties in Poland
18th century in the Polish–Lithuanian Commonwealth
Political parties with year of establishment missing
Political parties with year of disestablishment missing